The Izu Velodrome is a velodrome in Shizuoka, Japan. It has a 250-metre cycling track and spectator facilities for 3,600 people. It was opened in 2011, and was selected as the venue to host the track cycling events at the 2020 Summer Olympics in Tokyo. It is the only indoor 250-metre velodrome with a wooden timber surface in Japan, as other velodromes in Japan are outdoors that are longer than 250-metres and with asphalt surfaces, dedicated largely for keirin.

References

Sports venues in Shizuoka Prefecture
2011 establishments in Japan
Venues of the 2020 Summer Olympics
2020 Summer Paralympics
Cycling at the 2020 Summer Olympics
Indoor arenas in Japan
Olympic cycling venues
Venues of the 2026 Asian Games
Sports venues completed in 2011
Velodromes in Japan
Izu, Shizuoka